Rick Mallory is a former American football guard and college football coach.

Early years
From Renton, Washington, a suburb southeast of Seattle, Mallory played for the Washington Huskies from 1980 through 1983 under head coach Don James. He was a tight end his first two years, then moved to guard, where he was an All-Pac-10 performer and team captain.

Professional
Selected in the ninth round of the 1984 NFL Draft, Mallory played five seasons with the Tampa Bay Buccaneers, from 1984 through 1988.

Coaching
Mallory made his coaching debut at his alma mater, the University of Washington, as a graduate assistant in 1992. He became the tight ends coach in 1994 under head coach Jim Lambright, and stayed through the 1998 season.  Mallory moved on to coaching the offensive line at Memphis and UAB, then Middle Tennessee in 2013.

References

External links
 Middle Tennessee Blue Raiders bio
 Memphis Tigers bio
 UAB hiring
 

1960 births
Living people
American football offensive linemen
Washington Huskies football players
Tampa Bay Buccaneers players
Washington Huskies football coaches
Memphis Tigers football coaches
UAB Blazers football coaches
Players of American football from Washington (state)